Antonio Cuevas Delgado (Puente Ganil, Spain, 7 May 1949) is a Spanish politician and member of the Spanish Socialist Workers' Party (PSOE).

Married with three children, he studied at the University of Seville and became a technical architect. In the late 1960s he was a Trade Union activist for the Unión General de Trabajadores, which at that time was illegal under the Francoist State.

In 1986 he was elected to the Spanish Congress representing Seville and was re-elected at all subsequent elections in 1989, 1993, 1996, 2000, 2004 and 2008.

Cuevas was one of the earliest members of the reformist pro-capitalist "New Way" (nueva via) current within the PSOE which propelled leading member José Luis Rodríguez Zapatero to power. He is a strong supporter of a single energy market for Europe

References

1949 births
Living people
Politicians from Andalusia
University of Seville alumni
Spanish Socialist Workers' Party politicians
Members of the 3rd Congress of Deputies (Spain)
Members of the 4th Congress of Deputies (Spain)
Members of the 5th Congress of Deputies (Spain)
Members of the 6th Congress of Deputies (Spain)
Members of the 7th Congress of Deputies (Spain)
Members of the 8th Congress of Deputies (Spain)
Members of the 9th Congress of Deputies (Spain)
People from Campiña Sur (Córdoba)